The 1987 Rugby World Cup was the first Rugby World Cup. It was co-hosted by New Zealand and Australia – New Zealand hosted 21 matches (17 pool stage matches, two quarter-finals, the third-place play-off and the final) while Australia hosted 11 matches (seven pool matches, two quarter-finals and both semi-finals). The tournament was won by New Zealand, who were the strong favourites and won all their matches comfortably. New Zealand defeated France 29–9 in the final at Eden Park in Auckland. The New Zealand team was captained by David Kirk and included such rugby greats as Sean Fitzpatrick, John Kirwan, Grant Fox and Michael Jones. Wales finished third, and Australia fourth, after conceding crucial tries in the dying seconds of both their semi-final against France and the third-place play-off against Wales.

Seven of the sixteen participating teams were the International Rugby Football Board (IRFB) members – New Zealand, Australia, England, Scotland, Ireland, Wales and France. South Africa was unable to compete because of the international sporting boycott due to apartheid. Invitations were given to Argentina, Fiji, Italy, Canada, Romania, Tonga, Japan, Zimbabwe and the United States. This left Western Samoa controversially excluded, despite their better playing standard than some of the teams invited. The USSR were to be invited but they declined the invitation on political grounds, allegedly due to the continued IRFB membership of South Africa. There was no qualification process for the tournament.

The tournament witnessed a number of one-sided matches, with the seven IRFB members proving too strong for the other teams. Half of the 24 matches across the four pools saw one team score 40 or more points. The tournament was seen as a major success and proved that the event was viable in the long term.

Participating nations
The tournament comprised the seven members of the IRFB, and nine teams invited by the IRFB; there was no qualification process for teams.

South Africa was excluded due to its pro-apartheid policies.

Venues

Squads

Referees

  Kerry Fitzgerald
  Bob Fordham
  Fred Howard
  Roger Quittenton
  René Hourquet
  Guy Maurette
  David Burnett
  Stephen Hilditch
  Dave Bishop
  Keith Lawrence
  Brian Anderson
  Jim Fleming
  Derek Bevan
  Clive Norling

Pools and format

Pool 1 was played in Australia
Pool 2 was played with five matches held in New Zealand and one in Australia
Pool 3 was played in New Zealand
Pool 4 was played in New Zealand

The inaugural World Cup was contested by 16 nations. There was no qualifying tournament to determine the participants; instead, the 16 nations were invited by the International Rugby Football Board to compete. The simple 16-team pool/knock-out format was used with the teams divided into four pools of four, with each team playing the others in their pool once, for a total of three matches per team in the pool stage. Nations were awarded two points for a win, one for a draw and none for a loss: teams finishing level on points were separated by tries scored, rather than total points difference (had it been otherwise, Argentina would have taken second place in Group C ahead of Fiji, although France would still have won Group D.) The top two nations of every pool advanced to the quarter-finals. The runners-up of each pool faced the winners of a different pool in the quarter-finals. A standard single-elimination tournament followed, with the losers of the semi-finals contesting an additional play-off match to determine third place.

A total of 32 matches (24 in the pool stage and eight in the knock-out stage) were played in the tournament over 29 days from 22 May to 20 June 1987.

Pool stage

Pool 1

Pool 2

Pool 3

Pool 4

Knockout stage

Quarter-finals

Semi-finals

Third-place play-off

Final

Statistics

The tournament's top point scorer was New Zealand's Grant Fox, who scored 126 points. Craig Green and John Kirwan scored the most tries, six in total.

Broadcasters
The event was broadcast in Australia by ABC and by TVNZ in New Zealand as host broadcasters supplying their pictures to broadcasters around the world and in the United Kingdom by the BBC and in Ireland by RTE.

References

External links
Overview at rugbyworldcup.com

 
1987
1987 in Australian rugby union
1987 in New Zealand rugby union
International rugby union competitions hosted by Australia
International rugby union competitions hosted by New Zealand
Rugby
Rugby
Rugby
Rugby
Rugby
Rugby